Edwin Smith (born 2 January 1934) is a former county cricketer who played for Derbyshire between 1951 and 1971 and took over 1200 wickets.

Smith was born in Grassmoor, Derbyshire. He played his entire first-class career for Derbyshire, playing 503 First Class matches in a career spanning 20 years from 1951 to 1971.

Smith was primarily an off-spin bowler and took 1217 first-class wickets at an average of 25.84, with 51 5 wicket innings and a best performance of 9 for 46. He was also a useful lower middle order batsman and scored nearly 7000 runs with a highest score of 90.

England had a number of very good off-spin bowlers during Smith's career, including Jim Laker, Fred Titmus, David Allen and Ray Illingworth, which restricted his opportunities to play Test cricket.

References

External links

1934 births
Living people
Derbyshire cricketers
People from Grassmoor
Cricketers from Derbyshire
English cricketers
Marylebone Cricket Club cricketers
North v South cricketers